The 2019–20 Linafoot is the 59th season of the Linafoot, the top-tier football league in the Democratic Republic of the Congo, since its establishment in 1958. The season started on 16 August 2019., suspended on 16 March 2020 and abandoned on 13 May 2020 by the Congolese Association Football Federation due to the effects of the COVID-19 pandemic in DR Congo. 

TP Mazembe, who were at first place at the time of abandonment (table considered final) and declared champions, and AS Vita Club, who were at second place, will represent DR Congo in the 2020–21 CAF Champions League. 

AS Maniema Union and DC Motema Pembe, who were at third and fourth place will represent DR Congo in the 2020–21 CAF Confederation Cup.

The last two in the standings, OC Bukavu Dawa and AS Nyuki, are relegated to Ligue 2.

Teams changes
16 teams compete in this season: the top 13 teams from the previous season and three promoted teams from the Ligue 2. 

Relegated from Ligue 1
 FC Mont Bleu
 AS Dragons/Bilima
 OC Muungano

Promoted from Ligue 2
 OC Bukavu Dawa
 RC Kinshasa
 FC Simba Kolwezi

League table

 FC Renaissance du Congo were excluded on 3 September following fan violence after their second match, at home to SM Sanga Balende on 2 September and suspended for both the 2019/20 and the 2020/21 season, but, they were readmitted 8 days later.

Top goalscorers

References

Linafoot seasons
Congo DR